The 2005 European Team Judo Championships were held in Debrecen, Hungary on 22-23 October. The men's competition won by Israel, and the women's by France.

Results
Source:

Men

Women

References

External links
 

European Team Judo Championships
European Judo Championships
EU 2005
EU 2005
European Championships, Teams
Judo
Judo
European 2005
Judo
Judo